is a Japanese football player.

Career
Mikihito Arai joined J3 League club FC Ryukyu in 2017. He left the club at the end of 2018, where his contract got terminated.

Club statistics
Updated to 22 February 2018.

References

External links
Profile at FC Ryukyu

1994 births
Living people
Hannan University alumni
Association football people from Saitama Prefecture
Japanese footballers
J3 League players
FC Ryukyu players
Association football defenders